The Wilhelmøya Formation is a geologic formation in Svalbard, Norway. The marginal marine; concretionary, sideritic sandstones preserve indeterminate ichthyosaur and plesiosaur fossils dating back to the Rhaetian period.

See also 
 List of fossiliferous stratigraphic units in Norway

References 

Geologic formations of Norway
Triassic System of Europe
Triassic Norway
Rhaetian Stage
Sandstone formations
Paleontology in Norway
Geology of Svalbard